Mike Imlach (born 19 September 1962) is an English former footballer, who played as a full back in the Football League for Peterborough United and Tranmere Rovers. His father was the Scottish international Stewart Imlach. His brother is the author and television presenter, Gary Imlach.

References

External links

Leeds United F.C. players
Peterborough United F.C. players
Tranmere Rovers F.C. players
Association football fullbacks
English Football League players
1962 births
Living people
English footballers
English people of Scottish descent